Denver is a city in Bremer County in the U.S. state of Iowa. The population was 1,919 at the time of the 2020 census. It is part of the Waterloo–Cedar Falls Metropolitan Statistical Area.

History
Denver was originally called Jefferson City, but after the Star Mail Route, a mail service provided to towns having no federal service, was established, the town changed its name. When a federal post office was established in 1863, the name was changed to Denver. The community was incorporated on June 30, 1896.

Geography

Denver is located at  (42.672070, −92.333604).

Demographics

2010 census
As of the census of 2010, there were 1,780 people, 701 households, and 504 families living in the city. The racial makeup of the city was 98.8% White, 0.1% African American, 0.1% Native American, 0.3% Asian, 0.3% from other races, and 0.4% from two or more races. Hispanic or Latino of any race were 0.6% of the population.

There were 701 households, of which 34.5% had children under the age of 18 living with them, 62.2% were married couples living together, 7.3% had a female householder with no husband present, 2.4% had a male householder with no wife present, and 28.1% were non-families. 23.8% of all households were made up of individuals, and 12.9% had someone living alone who was 65 years of age or older. The average household size was 2.50 and the average family size was 2.97.

The median age in the city was 38.5 years. 26.5% of residents were under the age of 18; 6.9% were between the ages of 18 and 24; 25.8% were from 25 to 44; 24.1% were from 45 to 64; and 16.7% were 65 years of age or older. The gender makeup of the city was 47.6% male and 52.4% female.

2000 census
As of the census of 2000, there were 1,627 people, 648 households, and 476 families living in the city. The racial makeup of the city was 98.52% White, 0.18% African American, 0.18% Asian, 0.37% from other races, and 0.74% from two or more races. Hispanic or Latino of any race were 0.92% of the population.

There were 648 households, out of which 36.4% had children under the age of 18 living with them, 62.8% were married couples living together, 9.3% had a female householder with no husband present, and 26.4% were non-families. 24.4% of all households were made up of individuals, and 14.7% had someone living alone who was 65 years of age or older. The average household size was 2.46 and the average family size was 2.93.

26.4% were under the age of 18, 6.0% from 18 to 24, 25.9% from 25 to 44, 25.0% from 45 to 64, and 16.7% were 65 years of age or older. The median age was 40 years. For every 100 females, there were 89.6 males. For every 100 females age 18 and over, there were 81.5 males.

The median income for a household in the city was $44,375, and the median income for a family was $53,958. Males had a median income of $41,731 versus $24,830 for females. The per capita income for the city was $20,791. About 2.1% of families and 2.4% of the population were below the poverty line, including 0.9% of those under age 18 and 3.9% of those age 65 or over.

Education
The city of Denver is served by the Denver Community School District.

References

External links

  
 The City of Denver, Iowa Website Portal style website, Government, Business, Library, Recreation and more
 City-Data Comprehensive Statistical Data and more about Denver

Cities in Bremer County, Iowa
Cities in Iowa
Waterloo – Cedar Falls metropolitan area